Palo Pinto Independent School District is a public school district based in the community of Palo Pinto, Texas (USA).

The district has one school that serves students in Pre-Kindergarten (Pre-K) through sixth grade.

The district changed to a four day school week in fall 2022.

References

External links

School districts in Palo Pinto County, Texas